Lochrutton Loch is a large, lowland freshwater loch that lies to the west of Dumfries, Scotland. The loch was surveyed on 1 May 1905 by James Murray and L. W. Collett as part of Sir John Murray's Bathymetrical Survey of Fresh-Water Lochs of Scotland 1897-1909.

In the centre of the loch are the remains of a crannog known as Dutton's cairn. The crannog is thought to date from the Early Iron Age and was occupied until the Middle Ages. Finds from the excavation included a jet cross dating from the 13th century.

One of the areas adjacent to the loch is historically attested to have been known as 'Foot Ball Knowes' (knowe being the Scots for 'hillock'), possibly the only 'football' place name in Scotland, as early as 1815.

The loch is populated with bream, perch, pike and roach. No permit is required to fish on the loch.

References 

Lochs of Dumfries and Galloway
Freshwater lochs of Scotland